The String Quartet No. 2 (D 32) in C major was composed by Franz Schubert in 1812.

Movements
 Presto (C major)
 Andante (A minor)
 Menuetto (C major, with Trio in F major)
 Allegro con spirito (C minor – C major)

The autograph was widely scattered, and hence the first edition in the Alte Gesamt-Ausgabe only gives the first and third movements, as well as the second half of the finale in the critical report. The remainder was only discovered much later by Maurice J. E. Brown, who edited the complete work for publication.

Sources
 Franz Schubert's Works:
 Series V: Streichquartette edited by Joseph Hellmesberger and Eusebius Mandyczewski. Breitkopf & Härtel, 1890
 Series XXII: Revisionsbericht, Volume 1: Instrumentalmusik
 Otto Erich Deutsch (and others). Schubert Thematic Catalogue (several editions), No. 32.
 New Schubert Edition, Series VI, Volume 3: Streichquartette I edited by Martin Chusid. Bärenreiter, 1979.

External links 
 

String Quartet No. 02
1812 compositions